Wendy Sarahí Corcho Abreu (born 26 April 1999) is a Cuban footballer who plays as a defender. She has been a member of the Cuba women's national team.

International career
Corcho capped for Cuba at senior level during the 2018 CONCACAF Women's Championship.

References

1999 births
Living people
Cuban women's footballers
Cuba women's international footballers
Women's association football defenders